Coptotriche simulata is a moth of the family Tischeriidae. It was described by Annette Frances Braun in 1972. It is found in the US states of Arkansas, Kentucky and Ohio.

The larvae feed on Quercus alba, Quercus montana and Quercus stellata. They mine the leaves of their host plant.

References

Moths described in 1972
Tischeriidae